Argyle, officially named the Municipality of the District of Argyle, is a district municipality in Yarmouth County, Nova Scotia. Statistics Canada classifies the district municipality as a municipal district.

The district municipality occupies the eastern portion of the county and is one of three municipal units - the other two being the Town of Yarmouth and the Municipality of the District of Yarmouth. Argyle is a bilingual community, in which native speakers of English and French each account for about half of the population. As of 2016, 60% of the population speaks both French and English, one of the highest rates of bilingualism in Canada.

History
Originally inhabited by the Mi'kmaq, it was called "Bapkoktek". He called it Argyle (Argyll) because he was reminded of his previous home in the Highlands of Scotland. The township was granted in 1771.

Demographics

Education:
No certificate, diploma or degree: 41.64%
High school certificate: 16.38%
Apprenticeship or trade certificate or diploma: 14.16%
Community college, CEGEP or other non-university certificate or diploma: 19.36%
University certificate or diploma: 8.40%

Unemployment rate:
10.7%

Average house value:
$147,574

Communities

See also
 List of municipalities in Nova Scotia

References

External links

Communities in Yarmouth County
Argyle
Bilingualism in Canada
Linguistic geography of Canada